The Gainesville Sun is a newspaper published daily in Gainesville, Florida, United States, covering the North-Central portion of the state. The paper is published by Lynni Henderson, the paper's Executive Editor is Douglas Ray and the editorial page editor is Nathan Crabbe.

History

The paper was founded in July 1876 as the Gainesville Times, by brothers E. M. and William Wade Hampton, and was renamed as The Gainesville Sun in February 1879. The paper was first printed on July 6, 1876. It went through a series of ownership and name changes in the 1880s and 1890s, first being consolidated with Henry Hamilton McCreary's Weekly Bee as the Gainesville Sun and Bee, then as the Gainesville Daily Sun, and finally back to the Gainesville Sun.

It was bought by W.M. Pepper Sr., in 1917 for $50,000, and was published by the Pepper family for three generations, until it was sold to the Cowles Media Company in 1962. During the time it was owned by the Pepper family (specifically in 1922) an editor at the paper openly admitted his membership in the Ku Klux Klan and praised the Klan in print. This attitude helps to explain the editorial published in the paper following the Rosewood massacre justifying the actions of the whites, saying "Let it be understood now and forever that he, whether white or black, who brutally assaults an innocent and helpless woman, shall die the death of a dog." Conversely, the Tampa Tribune of the time called it "a lasting blot on the people of Levy county", clearly condemning rather than justifying the massacre.

In 1971, it was sold to The New York Times Company. On January 6, 2012, The Gainesville Sun was purchased by Halifax Media Group. In 2015, Halifax was acquired by New Media Investment Group.

An online edition was launched in 1995, initially called SunOne, and later simply GainesvilleSun.com. The website is now known as Gainesville.com. In 2005, it launched The Gainesville Guardian, a weekly paper aimed at East Gainesville and the city's African-American population, to mixed opinions.

Awards
The Gainesville Sun has won two Pulitzer Prizes: publisher John R. Harrison won in 1966 for his campaign for better housing codes, and editorialist Horance G. "Buddy" Davis Jr. won in 1971 for his editorials in support of peaceful desegregation of the local school system.

References

External links
 Gainesville.com, Gainesville Sun home page
 

Newspapers published in Florida
Gainesville, Florida
Publications established in 1876
Daily newspapers published in the United States
1876 establishments in Florida
Gannett publications